Odalmelech is a prehistoric large carved stone face of a god-king, and surrounding garden with additional carved stones, in Melekeok, on Babelthuap island of the nation of Palau. It was listed on the United States National Register of Historic Places in 1976; the listing includes the Odalmelech stone itself and several others.

References 

National Register of Historic Places in Palau
Monuments and memorials in Palau
Megalithic monuments